Perry Benson (born 9 April 1961) is a British character actor best known for his regular roles in British television sitcoms You Rang, M'Lord? (1988–1993), Oh, Doctor Beeching! (1995–1997) and Operation Good Guys (1997–2000). His first television appearance was as "Boy on Stairs" in the second episode of the BBC Children's drama, Grange Hill, in 1978.

Film career
Benson has appeared in the British films Quadrophenia (1979), Scum (1979), Love, Honour and Obey (2000), Alien Autopsy (2006), This Is England (2006), Somers Town (2008) and Mum & Dad (2008). He had a lead role in Stars of the Roller State Disco, a 1984 made-for-TV play by Alan Clarke.

Benson also appeared as Sex Pistols drummer Paul Cook in the 1986 biopic Sid And Nancy. In 1987, he played Trevor in the Hi De Hi episode "Tell It to the Marines".

Benson appears as a policeman in the video for Goldie Looking Chain's single "Guns Don't Kill People Rappers Do".
Benson also appeared as a bank robber in a 2008 episode (Let's Not Be Heisty) of the BBC sitcom My Family alongside Pauline Quirke, Robert Lindsay and Daniela Denby-Ashe.
Benson appeared alongside Jimmy Nail in the BBC TV show Parents of the Band, written by Dick Clement and Ian La Frenais. He also starred in the vampire film Dead Cert, directed by Steven Lawson.

In 2012 (released 2013 in the UK), he played an ageing rock star alongside Phil Daniels and Keith Allen in Sara Sugarman's film Vinyl.

Television roles

Filmography

References

External links

1961 births
Living people
English male film actors
English male television actors
Male actors from London